Stewart is a census-designated place and unincorporated community in Montgomery County, Mississippi, United States.

U.S. Route 82 passes through Stewart, and the Big Black River flows south of the settlement.

The Stewart Volunteer Fire Department is located in Stewart.

History
The Georgia Pacific Railway completed a line through Stewart in late 1880s.

By 1906, Stewert had a post office and a population of 200.

It was first named as a CDP in the 2020 Census which listed a population of 99.

Demographics

2020 census

Note: the US Census treats Hispanic/Latino as an ethnic category. This table excludes Latinos from the racial categories and assigns them to a separate category. Hispanics/Latinos can be of any race.

References

Unincorporated communities in Montgomery County, Mississippi
Unincorporated communities in Mississippi
Census-designated places in Montgomery County, Mississippi